

Recordings
Grand Prix du disque de l'Académie Charles Cros
  1960 Bohuslav Martinů - 6th Symphony "Fantasies symphoniques" by Czech Philharmonic Orchestra, conducted by Karel Ančerl  
  1966  Leoš Janáček - String Quartets Nos. 1 and 2 by The Janáček Quartet
  2006  Karel Ančerl Gold Edition, the collection of 42 remastered albums conducted by Karel Ančerl, recorded 1950-1968 and released 2002-2005 by Supraphon label.
 
Cannes Classical Awards
  2003 - Jan Dismas Zelenka: Sub olea pacis et palma virtutis by Musica Florea ensemble, conducted Marek Štryncl

See also
Music of the Czech Republic

References

External links
  Grand Prix du Disque

 
Czech
Music awards
Awards, Czech